Pialeia is a village and a former municipality in the Trikala regional unit, Thessaly, Greece. Since the 2011 local government reform it is part of the municipality Pyli, of which it is a municipal unit. The municipal unit has an area of 52.517 km2. Population 3,395 (2011).

It used to be a place where only farmers lived. However, nowadays it is considered to be as a place where people who live in Trikala build their houses in order to stay away from the city.

References

Villages in Greece
Populated places in Trikala (regional unit)